Telemachus was the leader of a 554 BC general uprising in the Greek city-state of Acragas, Sicily, which culminated in the overthrow of the cruel tyrant Phalaris, who was roasted to death in his own brazen bull.   

Telemachus was the ancestor of Aenesidamus and of Aenesidamus's son Theron (tyrant c. 488–472 BC).

Ancient Acragantines
6th-century BC Greek people